The Phage T1 Holin (T1 Holin) Family (TC# 1.E.37) is represented in enterobacterial phages T1, RTP and F20, Klebsiella phage KP36, and Escherichia phage ADB-2. Additionally, Gp9 of E. coli phage phiE49 is similar in sequence. These proteins are short, 55 to 71 amino acyl residues (aas) in length, and exhibit a single transmembrane segment (TMS). A representative list of proteins belonging to the T1 Holin family can be found in the Transporter Classification Database.

See also 
 Holin
 Lysin
 Transporter Classification Database

Further reading 
 .
 .
 .
 .

References 

Protein families
Membrane proteins
Transmembrane proteins
Transmembrane transporters
Transport proteins
Integral membrane proteins
Holins